Gislum had an old grocery store in Gislum, that worked as both a farm and a grocery store. Closed in 1980. The old school in Gislum. In folkemony it is called just for the red school. Was closed in 1967 and sold to private. The White School, which has served as a school. It was closed in the early 1970s. In 1432 there was something called Gislum call and it was because the prist of Gislum was in control over Vognsild, Svingelbjerg and Farsø parish.

Gislum parish
Gislum parish is a parish in Vesthimmerlands Provsti (Viborg Stift). Sognet is located in Vesthimmerland Municipality; Until the communal reform in 1970 it was in Gislum Herred (Aalborg County). In Gislum parish is Gislum Church.

Notable people 
 Jens Bigum (born 1938 in Gislum) a Danish business executive and former CEO of Arla Foods

References

Villages in Denmark
Towns and settlements in Vesthimmerland Municipality